The Welsh Dragon (meaning 'the red dragon') is a heraldic symbol that represents Wales and appears on the national flag of Wales. 

As an emblem, the red dragon of Wales has been used since the reign of Cadwaladr, King of Gwynedd from around 655AD and is historically known as the "Red Dragon of Cadwaladr". Ancient leaders of the Celtic Britons that are personified as dragons include Maelgwn Gwynedd, Mynyddog Mwynfawr and Urien Rheged. Later Welsh "dragons" include Owain Gwynedd, Llywelyn ap Gruffydd and Owain Glyndŵr.

The red dragon appears in the ancient Mabinogion story of Lludd and Llefelys where it is confined, battling with an invading white dragon, at Dinas Emrys. He is told by a boy, Emrys, to dig up two dragons fighting beneath the castle. He discovers the white dragon representing the Anglo-Saxons, which is soon to be defeated by the red dragon of the Wales.

The red dragon is now seen as symbolising Wales, present on the current national flag of Wales, which became an official flag in 1959.

History

Draco as military standard and title 

The military use of the term "dragon" (in Latin, "draco") dates back to the Roman period and this in turn is likely inspired by the symbols of the Scythians, Indians, Persians, Dacians or Parthians. The term draco can refer to a dragon, serpent or snake and the term draconarius (also latin) denotes "the bearer of the serpent standard". Franz Altheim suggests that the first appearance of the draco used by Romans coincides with Roman recruitment of nomad troops from south and central Asia during the time of Marcus Aurelius. One notable Draco symbol which may have influenced the Welsh dragon is that of the Sarmatians, who contributed to the cavalry units stationed in Ribchester from the 2nd to 4th centuries. Cohorts were represented by the draco military standard from the third century in the same way that the eagle Aquila standard represented the legions. The standard bearer of the cohort was called draconarius and carried a gilded staff with a dragon at the top. For instance, Gauls are attested to have marched under the dragon to distinguish the Gallic cohort from the Roman legions.

After Roman departure 
After the Roman withdrawal it has long been suggested that resistance to the Saxon incursion was led either by Romans or Romanised Britons, and this is evident in the names attributed in legend to those who led the opposition, including Ambrosius Aurelianus and perhaps Artorius. This could account for how the Roman terminology came to be adopted by Britons. From the first extant written records of the Britons, it became evident that dragons were already associated with military leaders. Gildas, writing in about 540, spoke of the Briton chieftain Maglocunus (Maelgwn Gwynedd in Welsh) as the "insularis draco". 

The early Welsh or Brythonic poets, Taliesin and Aneirin both extensively use dragons as an image for military leaders, and for the Britons the word dragon began to take the form of a term for a war leader, prince or ruler. In Y Gododdin, Aneirin describes his patron, Mynyddog Mwynfawr as "the dragon" when he speaks of the "feast of the dragon". He also describes the war leader, Gwernabwy mab Gwen, as the dragon of the battle of Catraeth. Owain ap Urien is called Owain ben draic, the chief dragon. Although not compiled until later, the main part of Y Gododdin and the heroic poems on Urien Rheged by Taliesin almost certainly date in origin to the sixth century.

The Welsh term  was used to refer to Welsh leaders including Owain Gwynedd, Llywelyn ap Gruffudd (Llywelyn the Last) and "the dragon" Owain Glyndŵr. Cynddelw Brydydd Mawr, a court poet to Owain Gwynedd, refers to him in one elegy, personifying him as "The golden dragon of Snowdonia of eagles".

Red dragon of Cadwaladr 
As an emblem, the red dragon of Wales has been used since the reign of Cadwaladr, King of Gwynedd from around 655AD. The Red Welsh dragon is often described as the "Red Dragon of Cadwaladr" for this reason. Later Taliesin poems reference the return of Cadwaladr (r. circa 655 to 682) and coming Saxon liberation.

Mabinogion 

In the Mabinogion story Lludd and Llefelys, the red dragon fights with an invading White Dragon. A plague is caused by a battle between a red dragon and a foreign white dragon. Lludd must set a trap for them at the exact centre of the island called Oxford, put them to sleep with mead, and then bury them underground in a stone chest. The third plague is caused by a mighty magician, who casts a spell to make the whole court fall asleep while he raids their stores. Lludd must confront him, keeping himself awake with a vat of cold water. Lludd returns home to Britain. He destroys the Coraniaid with the insect mixture and confines the dragons at Dinas Emrys. Finally he fights the magician, who submits to him to become his loyal servant.

The tale is taken up in the Historia Brittonum, written by Nennius. Historia Brittonum was written circa 828, and by this point the dragon was no longer just a military symbol but associated with a coming deliverer from the Saxons. It is also the first time that the colour of the dragon is verifiably given as red. Nevertheless there may well be an older attribution of red to the colour of the dragon in Y Gododdin. The story of Lludd and Llefelys in the Mabinogion settles the matter, firmly establishing the red dragon of the Celtic Britons being in opposition with the white dragon of the Saxons.

In chapters 40–42 there is a narrative in which the tyrant Vortigern flees into Wales to escape the Anglo-Saxon invaders. There he chooses a hill-fort as the site for his royal retreat, and attempts to build a citadel, but the structure collapses repeatedly. His wise men tell him he must sacrifice a young boy born without a father on the spot to alleviate the curse.  The King sent his soldiers out across the land to find such a lad. and discovers such a boy, Emrys (Ambrosius Aurelianus), but Emrys reveals the real reason for the collapsing towers: a hidden pool containing two dragons, one red and one white, representing the Britons and the Saxons specifically, are buried beneath the foundation.  He explains how the White Dragon of the Saxons, though winning the battle at present, would soon be defeated by the Welsh Red Dragon. After Vortigern's downfall, the fort was given to High-King Ambrosius Aurelianus, known in Welsh as Emrys Wledig, hence its name.

Geoffrey of Monmouth 

The same story of the red and white dragons is repeated in Geoffrey of Monmouth's History of the Kings of Britain, where the red dragon is also a prophecy of the coming of King Arthur.

When the later Arthurian legends reached their modern form, Geoffrey of Monmouth, writing in the 12th century for a French and Breton audience, wrote that King Arthur used a golden dragon banner. His standard was also emblazoned with a golden dragon. It is also mentioned in at least four manuscripts that Arthur is associated with the golden dragon, and the standard functions as a haven for wounded soldiers in battles. Geoffrey of Monmouth reports that Arthur used the standard within his vicinity at the rear of the battle for the attention of his wounded soldiers.

Owain Glyndŵr 

It was famously raised over  during the Battle of Tuthill in 1401 against the English.  chose to fly the standard of a golden dragon on a white background, the traditional standard that, supposedly, Uther Pendragon had flown when the first Celtic Britons had fought the Saxons to a standstill almost 1,000 years before, and passed down to his son King Arthur. Adam of Usk reports that Glyndwr's golden dragon was the first use of a dragon standard used in war by Welsh troops on the 1st of November, 1401. Historian John Davies adds that the dragon raised by Glyndwr was a symbol of victory for the Celtic Britons.

On his seals Glyndwr is also depicted with a Welsh dragon on his helmet, his horse's head and his crown. Glyndŵr's Great Seal as Prince of Wales also included a dragon gules on his crest.

House of Tudor 
On Edmund Tudor, 1st Earl of Richmond's tomb is an effigy detailing him wearing a crown affixed with the dragon of Cadwaladr. Following his son's victory at Bosworth field, Henry VII used a red dragon on a white and green background upon entering St Paul's. Henry the VII used the dragon motif, but this was used as part of the heraldry of house Tudor rather than of Wales. The dragon of Cadwaladr was used as a supporter on the royal arms of all Tudor sovereigns of England and also appeared on the standards of Henry VII and Henry VIII.

Royal badge 

The red dragon did not become an official royal heraldic badge until 1800, when George III issued a royal warrant confirming the badge, blazoned as: On a mount Vert a dragon passant with wings elevated Gules.

There is a further badge for Wales, belonging to the Princes of Wales since 1901, of the red dragon on a mount but with a label of three points Argent about the shoulder to difference it from the monarch's badge. The badge became a part of the Coat of arms of the Prince of Wales by Royal Warrant.

In 1953, the red dragon badge was given an augmentation of honour. The augmented badge is blazoned: Within a circular riband Argent fimbriated Or bearing the motto Y DDRAIG GOCH DDYRY CYCHWYN ["the red dragon inspires action"], in letters Vert, and ensigned with a representation of the Crown proper, an escutcheon per fesse Argent and Vert and thereon the Red Dragon passant. Winston Churchill, the then prime minister, despised the badge's design, as is revealed in the following Cabinet minute from 1953:

In 1959, Government use of this flag was dropped in favour of the current flag at the urging of the Gorsedd of Bards.

The badge was used by the Wales Office and was printed on Statutory Instruments made by the National Assembly for Wales. The badge was previously used in the corporate logo of the Assembly until the "dynamic dragon" logo was adopted.

This Royal badge was supplanted by a new official Royal badge in 2008, which eliminated the red dragon altogether.

Early modern use 

In the 1909 national pageant of Wales, the Welsh dragon appears upright on a white background. The Welsh dragon that appears on the flag on board Captain Scott's Terra Nova is also an upright dragon (sergeant) on a white and green background. Up until this point, there was no standardised version of the Welsh dragon.
The dragon was used on banners during women's suffrage events in Wales in the 1900s and 1910s. The banner's accession documents included a note from one of the former members "The banner was worked by Mrs Henry Lewis… [she] was also President of the South Wales Federation of Women's Suffrage Societies + she led the S. Wales section of the great Suffrage Procession in London on June 17th 1911, walking in front of her own beautiful banner… It was a great occasion, some 40,000 to 50,000 men + women taking part in the walk from Whitehall through Pall Mall, St James's Street + Piccadilly to the Albert Hall. The dragon attracted much attention – “Here comes the Devil” was the greeting of one group of on lookers."

Current use

Flag of Wales 

As an emblem, the red dragon of Wales is present on the national flag of Wales, which became an official flag in 1959.

Welsh government logo 
The emblem (or logo) used by the Welsh Government is that of the Welsh dragon. According to their guidance, the "logo consists of a dragon and Welsh Government name separated by a horizontal line, positioned together in a fixed relationship which must not be altered. These elements are aligned centrally with each other.

Welsh language society 

Tafod y Ddraig (Tongue of the dragon) is a symbol which represents the Welsh Language Society.

Wales football 
The Welsh dragon, "the most iconic of Welsh emblems", is also used as the official emblem or logo of the Football Association of Wales which was redesigned in 2019.

Mottos 
The motto "Anorchfygol Ddraig Cymru" ("Unconquerable Dragon of Wales') is associated with the red dragon.

The motto "Y ddraig goch ddyry cychwyn" ("The red dragon will show the way"). This motto is in the strict poetic metre of cynghanedd.

Gallery

Notes

References

Bibliography 
 Gantz, Jeffrey (translator) (1987). The Mabinogion. New York: Penguin. .
 
 
 

Flags of Wales
Dragon
Dragon
European dragons
Dragons
Heraldic charges
Heraldic badges